"You Don't Know Love" is a song written by Don King and Beckie Foster, and recorded by American country music artist Janie Fricke.  It was released in January 1983 as the second single from the album It Ain't Easy.  The song reached #4 on the Billboard Hot Country Singles & Tracks chart.

Chart performance

References

1983 singles
Janie Fricke songs
Song recordings produced by Bob Montgomery (songwriter)
Columbia Records singles
1982 songs
Songs written by Beckie Foster